Kentucky was the greatest producer of hemp in the United States during the 19th and 20th centuries, when it was the source of three fourths of U.S. hemp fiber. Production started to decline after World War I due to the rise of tobacco as the cash crop in Kentucky and the foreign competition of hemp fibers and finished products. In 1970, federal policies virtually banned the production of industrial hemp during the War on Drugs saying all Cannabis sativa is a Schedule I controlled substance. Federal law under the Agricultural Act of 2014 allowed research back into hemp. Kentucky began production again with 33 acres in 2014. The first 500-acre commercial crop was planted in Harrison County in 2017, and research  permits were issued for over  that year. The 2016 documentary Harvesting Liberty concerns the 21st century Kentucky hemp industry.

History

Early cultivation

In the 18th century, John Filson wrote in Kentucke and the Adventures of Col. Daniel Boone (an appendix of his 1784 work The Discovery, Settlement and Present State of Kentucke) of the quality of Kentucky's land and climate for hemp production. The  first hemp crop in Kentucky was raised near Danville in 1775.

Kentucky was the greatest producer of U.S. hemp in the 19th and 20th centuries, with thousands of acres of hemp in production. Senator Henry Clay was a "hemp pioneer" and the "strongest advocate" of Kentucky hemp. He grew it on his Kentucky estate Ashland and brought new seeds to the state from Asia. Clay's oratory on the Senate floor in 1810 in favor of requiring the Navy to use domestic hemp exclusively for ship's rigging was widely reprinted in newspapers and is credited for beginning the elaboration of the American System. According to a 1902 periodical, Kentucky was responsible for three quarters of U.S. hemp fiber production. Production reached a peak in 1917 at 18,000 acres, mostly grown in the Bluegrass region, then waned due to market forces after World War I as other sources of fiber were introduced. A Federal program to reintroduce hemp for wartime needs in Kentucky and other states during World War II reached 52,000 acres in Kentucky in 1943. The WWII effort is documented in the U.S Department of Agriculture film Hemp for Victory .

Decline and criminalization
Production of hemp had seen a decline after World War I due to market forces including the rise of tobacco as the cash crop of choice in Kentucky and foreign sources of hemp fiber and finished products. The availability of cheap synthetic fiber after World War II even further discouraged farmers from growing it.

Federal policies, tightened by the Controlled Substances Act of 1970, virtually banned the production of industrial hemp during the War on Drugs. According to an industry group, "the 1970 Act abolished the taxation approach [of the 1937 Marijuana Tax Act] and effectively made all cannabis cultivation illegal". The Drug Enforcement Administration (DEA) refused to issue permits for legal hemp cultivation and held that, since industrial hemp is from the same species plant as prohibited cannabis (despite its being of lower THC yield), both were prohibited under the Controlled Substances Act. In the words of a 2015 PBS NewsHour segment on hemp, "[t]o the federal government, hemp is just as illegal as marijuana", and according to Newsweek, "all cannabis sativa—whether grown to ease chronic pain, get stoned or make rope—is a schedule I controlled substance".

During this criminalized period, the Cornbread Mafia began its illegal cultivation of marijuana by cross-breeding imported cannabis seeds with native hemp plants left behind after the "Hemp For Victory" period in World War II.

Partial re-legalization
By the late 20th century, consumer demand for hemp products was resurgent but American farmers were left as bystanders. Imported agricultural products were allowed from other countries, including Canada, but growing hemp legally was not possible in the United States. In 1994, Kentucky was one of the first states to consider reintroducing hemp cultivation, with a commission convened by governor Brereton Jones to investigate legal pathways to do so. In 2013, Kentucky passed a state law, Senate Bill 50, allowing production for agricultural research purposes.

The  was conducted under the auspices of the Kentucky Department of Agriculture. Research at the University of Kentucky's Spindletop Research Farm sought to improved agronomy and includes research on optimizing cannabinoid yield. The first research crops at Spindletop and Murray State University were planted in May 2014, with seed obtained from California and, after a legal battle with the DEA, imported from Italy. The first 500-acre commercial crop was planted in Harrison County in 2017, and research  permits were issued for over  that year.

Legal status
Under federal law, the THC present in both cannabis and hemp remains a Schedule I controlled substance. Under state law, all hemp grown in compliance with the 2014 farm bill must have a delta-9 THC content not more than 0.3%. Farmers participating in the program must use seeds provided by an educational institution with a DEA license and use varieties expected to be low in THC. A sample of each farmer's hemp crop is tested by the state.

Under the 2018 United States farm bill, commodity hemp production was federally legalized.

Production

Businesses exist in Kentucky which provide agricultural products based on hemp or supporting hemp production. Cynthiana-based Ananda Hemp has been operating in the Commonwealth since 2014.

Oil extraction
GenCanna and Atalo Holdings are hopeful of turning their property at Winchester into a "Hemp Research Campus".

Seed production
Three varieties of hemp seed from Lexington seed company  were the first to be certified by Colorado Department of Agriculture. Certified in late 2016 for the 2017 Colorado crop, the varieties were originally from Italy and Serbia.

Documentaries and Books
Documentary films concerning Kentucky hemp have included Hemp for Victory (U.S. Department of Agriculture, 1942) and Harvesting Liberty (Mike Lewis, 2016), which shows farmers in rural Kentucky considering hemp farming for food, fuel and fiber.

The nonfiction book, The Cornbread Mafia by James Higdon has 14 references to Kentucky hemp.

See also

 Agriculture in Kentucky
 History of Kentucky

Footnotes

References

Citations

Bibliography
 
  (originally published 1951)
 
 
 
 
 
Willard Rouse Jillson, Kentucky Hemp: A History of the Industry in a Commonwealth of the Upper South, 1775-1942, Woodford Chamber of Commerce. 
James Lane Allen, The Reign of Law: A Tale of the Kentucky Hemp Fields, Library of Alexandria, .

Further reading

External links

 Kentucky Hempsters
 Kentucky Hemp Industries Association
  May 8, 2015

Agriculture in Kentucky
Cannabis in Kentucky
Kentucky